The 2023 General Tire 150 was the second stock car race of the 2023 ARCA Menards Series season, the first race of the 2023 ARCA Menards Series West season, and the 4th iteration of the event. The race was held on Friday, March 10, 2023, in Avondale, Arizona at Phoenix Raceway, a 1-mile (1.6 km) permanent tri-oval shaped asphalt speedway. The race was increased from 150 laps to 160 laps, due to a NASCAR overtime finish. In a wreck-filled race, Tyler Reif, driving for Lowden Jackson Motorsports, scored the upset win after passing Landen Lewis for the lead on the final lap. This was Reif's first career ARCA Menards Series and ARCA Menards Series West win in only his third start. William Sawalich, who started on the pole, dominated the majority of the race, leading 93 laps before getting spun with two laps to go. To fill out the podium, Bradley Erickson, driving for Naake-Klauer Motorsports, would finish in 3rd, respectively.

Background 
Phoenix Raceway is a 1-mile, low-banked tri-oval race track located in Avondale, Arizona, near Phoenix. The motorsport track opened in 1964 and currently hosts two NASCAR race weekends annually including the final championship race since 2020. Phoenix Raceway has also hosted the CART, IndyCar Series, USAC and the WeatherTech SportsCar Championship. The raceway is currently owned and operated by NASCAR.

Entry list 

 (R) denotes rookie driver.

Practice 
The first and only practice session was held on Friday, March 10, at 3:00 PM MST, and would last for 45 minutes.

Qualifying 
Qualifying was held on Friday, March 10, at 4:30 PM MST. The qualifying system used is a single-car, single-lap system with only one round. Whoever sets the fastest time in that round wins the pole.

Race results

Standings after the race 

Drivers' Championship standings (ARCA Main)

Drivers' Championship standings (ARCA West)

Note: Only the first 10 positions are included for the driver standings.

References 

NASCAR races at Phoenix Raceway
March 2023 sports events in the United States
2023 in sports in Arizona